Eslövs IK is a sports club in Eslöv, Sweden, established in 1961. The club nowadays mostly runs handball activity. The women's team won the Swedish national indoor championship titles in 2002 and 2003.

The women's team plays under the name Eslövs IK (up to 2002 Team Skåne EIK). The club also runs the women's Division 2 team 'Eslövstjejerna'.

Sports Hall information

Name: – Eslövshallen
City: – Eslöv
Capacity: – 1500
Address: – Onsjövägen 3, 241 34 Eslöv, Sweden

Kits

References

External links
 Official website 
 

1961 establishments in Sweden
Handball clubs established in 1961
Football clubs in Skåne County
Swedish handball clubs
Sport in Skåne County